The men's individual cross country event was part of the track and field athletics programme at the 1924 Summer Olympics. It was the third and last appearance of this event. The competition was held on Saturday, July 12, 1924. Thirty-eight runners from ten nations competed.

Results

The first three runners for each nation to finish this event also counted towards the cross country team result.

The course was 10,650m in length.

The course was unusually difficult, including stone paths that were covered in knee-high thistles and weeds. This, combined with extreme weather conditions of over 40 °C and noxious fumes emitted from a power plant near the course, resulted in only fifteen of the 38 starters crossing the finish line.  After the event, both the Red Cross and local police spent hours searching for runners who had passed out on the course.

References

External links
Olympic Report
 

Men's cross country individual
1924